Songaila is the masculine form of a Lithuanian family name. Its feminine forms  are: Songailienė (Samogitian: Songālienė; married woman or widow) and Songailaitė (Samogitian: Songālaitė; unmarried woman). Variants Sungaila or Sungail were mentioned in the Treaty of Königsberg (1390).

There is a place  in Tauragė District Municipality, Lithuania, named after the surname.

Notable people with the surname include:
Darius Songaila – Lithuanian basketball player
Ringaudas Songaila – high-ranked politician of the Lithuanian SSR
 – politician, chairman of the Lithuanian Nationalists Union
 – architect

 (1398 – after 1433), nobleman of the Grand Duchy of Lithuania
 (born 1977), Lithuanian ethnolinguist, folklore performer and TV host

Lithuanian-language surnames